David Brekalo (born 3 December 1998) is a Slovenian footballer who plays as a centre-back for Norwegian Eliteserien club Viking FK.

Club career
Brekalo is a youth product of NK Bravo, where he began his football career in 2007. He made his Slovenian PrvaLiga debut for the club on 14 July 2019 in a game against Olimpija Ljubljana. In January 2021, he was linked to Swedish club Malmö FF. On 11 August 2021, he instead joined Norwegian club Viking FK, signing a three-and-a-half-year contract. He made his debut only four days later, in a 3–2 win against Molde, where he scored the winning goal in added time. On 28 November 2021, he received a red card for pushing teammate Patrik Gunnarsson in the final minutes of a 3–2 win against Kristiansund.

International career
On 26 March 2022, Brekalo made his international debut for Slovenia in a 1–1 draw against Croatia.

Career statistics

References

External links
 David Brekalo at NZS 

1998 births
Living people
Footballers from Ljubljana
Slovenian footballers
Slovenia youth international footballers
Slovenia under-21 international footballers
Slovenia international footballers
Association football defenders
Slovenian Second League players
Slovenian PrvaLiga players
Eliteserien players
NK Bravo players
Viking FK players
Slovenian expatriate footballers
Expatriate footballers in Norway
Slovenian expatriate sportspeople in Norway